Piedmontese is a Romance language spoken in northwestern Italy.

Piedmontese may also refer to:

 People or things of or relating to Piedmont
 Piedmontese (cattle), a specific breed

See also
 
 Piemontese (disambiguation)
 French frigate Piémontaise (1804)